Cysteine (symbol Cys or C) is a semiessential proteinogenic amino acid with the formula . The thiol side chain in cysteine often participates in enzymatic reactions as a nucleophile. Cysteine is chiral.  Only L-cysteine is found in nature.

The thiol is susceptible to oxidation to give the disulfide derivative cystine, which serves an important structural role in many proteins. In this case, the symbol Cyx is sometimes used. When used as a food additive, it has the E number E920.

Cysteine is encoded by the codons UGU and UGC.

Structure
Like other amino acids (not as a residue of a protein), cysteine exists as a zwitterion. Cysteine has  chirality in the older / notation based on homology to - and -glyceraldehyde. In the newer R/S system of designating chirality, based on the atomic numbers of atoms near the asymmetric carbon, cysteine (and selenocysteine) have R chirality, because of the presence of sulfur (or selenium) as a second neighbor to the asymmetric carbon atom. The remaining chiral amino acids, having lighter atoms in that position, have S chirality. Replacing sulfur with selenium gives selenocysteine.

Dietary sources
Cysteinyl is a residue in high-protein foods. Some foods considered rich in cysteine include poultry, eggs, beef, and whole grains. In high-protein diets, cysteine may be partially responsible for reduced blood pressure and stroke risk. Although classified as a nonessential amino acid, in rare cases, cysteine may be essential for infants, the elderly, and individuals with certain metabolic diseases or who suffer from malabsorption syndromes. Cysteine can usually be synthesized by the human body under normal physiological conditions if a sufficient quantity of methionine is available.

Industrial sources 

The majority of -cysteine is obtained industrially by hydrolysis of animal materials, such as poultry feathers or hog hair. Despite widespread belief otherwise, little evidence shows that human hair is used as a source material and its use is explicitly banned for food additives and cosmetic products in the European Union. Synthetically produced -cysteine, compliant with Jewish kosher and Muslim halal laws, is also available, albeit at a higher price. The synthetic route involves fermentation using a mutant of E. coli. Evonik (formerly Degussa) introduced a route from substituted thiazolines. Following this technology, -cysteine is produced by the hydrolysis of racemic 2-amino-Δ2-thiazoline-4-carboxylic acid using Pseudomonas thiazolinophilum.

Biosynthesis 

In animals, biosynthesis begins with the amino acid serine. The sulfur is derived from methionine, which is converted to homocysteine through the intermediate S-adenosylmethionine. Cystathionine beta-synthase then combines homocysteine and serine to form the asymmetrical thioether cystathionine. The enzyme cystathionine gamma-lyase converts the cystathionine into cysteine and alpha-ketobutyrate. In plants and bacteria, cysteine biosynthesis also starts from serine, which is converted to O-acetylserine by the enzyme serine transacetylase. The enzyme cysteine synthase, using sulfide sources, converts this ester into cysteine, releasing acetate.

Biological functions
The cysteine sulfhydryl group is nucleophilic and easily oxidized. The reactivity is enhanced when the thiol is ionized, and cysteine residues in proteins have pKa values close to neutrality, so are often in their reactive thiolate form in the cell. Because of its high reactivity, the sulfhydryl group of cysteine has numerous biological functions.

Precursor to the antioxidant glutathione
Due to the ability of thiols to undergo redox reactions, cysteine and cysteinyl residues have antioxidant properties. Its antioxidant properties are typically expressed in the tripeptide glutathione, which occurs in humans and other organisms. The systemic availability of oral glutathione (GSH) is negligible; so it must be biosynthesized from its constituent amino acids, cysteine, glycine, and glutamic acid. While glutamic acid is usually sufficient because amino acid nitrogen is recycled through glutamate as an intermediary, dietary cysteine and glycine supplementation can improve synthesis of glutathione.

Precursor to iron-sulfur clusters
Cysteine is an important source of sulfide in human metabolism. The sulfide in iron-sulfur clusters and in nitrogenase is extracted from cysteine, which is converted to alanine in the process.

Metal ion binding
Beyond the iron-sulfur proteins, many other metal cofactors in enzymes are bound to the thiolate substituent of cysteinyl residues. Examples include zinc in zinc fingers and alcohol dehydrogenase, copper in the blue copper proteins, iron in cytochrome P450, and nickel in the [NiFe]-hydrogenases. The sulfhydryl group also has a high affinity for heavy metals, so that proteins containing cysteine, such as metallothionein, will bind metals such as mercury, lead, and cadmium tightly.

Roles in protein structure
In the translation of messenger RNA molecules to produce polypeptides, cysteine is coded for by the UGU and UGC codons.

Cysteine has traditionally been considered to be a hydrophilic amino acid, based largely on the chemical parallel between its sulfhydryl group and the hydroxyl groups in the side chains of other polar amino acids. However, the cysteine side chain has been shown to stabilize hydrophobic interactions in micelles to a greater degree than the side chain in the nonpolar amino acid glycine and the polar amino acid serine. In a statistical analysis of the frequency with which amino acids appear in different chemical environments in the structures of proteins, free cysteine residues were found to associate with hydrophobic regions of proteins. Their hydrophobic tendency was equivalent to that of known nonpolar amino acids such as methionine and tyrosine (tyrosine is polar aromatic but also hydrophobic), those of which were much greater than that of known polar amino acids such as serine and threonine. Hydrophobicity scales, which rank amino acids from most hydrophobic to most hydrophilic, consistently place cysteine towards the hydrophobic end of the spectrum, even when they are based on methods that are not influenced by the tendency of cysteines to form disulfide bonds in proteins. Therefore, cysteine is now often grouped among the hydrophobic amino acids, though it is sometimes also classified as slightly polar, or polar.

While free cysteine residues do occur in proteins, most are covalently bonded to other cysteine residues to form disulfide bonds, which play an important role in the folding and stability of some proteins, usually proteins secreted to the extracellular medium. Since most cellular compartments are reducing environments, disulfide bonds are generally unstable in the cytosol with some exceptions as noted below.

Disulfide bonds in proteins are formed by oxidation of the sulfhydryl group of cysteine residues. The other sulfur-containing amino acid, methionine, cannot form disulfide bonds. More aggressive oxidants convert cysteine to the corresponding sulfinic acid and sulfonic acid. Cysteine residues play a valuable role by crosslinking proteins, which increases the rigidity of proteins and also functions to confer proteolytic resistance (since protein export is a costly process, minimizing its necessity is advantageous). Inside the cell, disulfide bridges between cysteine residues within a polypeptide support the protein's tertiary structure. Insulin is an example of a protein with cystine crosslinking, wherein two separate peptide chains are connected by a pair of disulfide bonds.

Protein disulfide isomerases catalyze the proper formation of disulfide bonds; the cell transfers dehydroascorbic acid to the endoplasmic reticulum, which oxidizes the environment. In this environment, cysteines are, in general, oxidized to cystine and are no longer functional as a nucleophiles.

Aside from its oxidation to cystine, cysteine participates in numerous post-translational modifications. The nucleophilic sulfhydryl group allows cysteine to conjugate to other groups, e.g., in prenylation. Ubiquitin ligases transfer ubiquitin to its pendant, proteins, and caspases, which engage in proteolysis in the apoptotic cycle. Inteins often function with the help of a catalytic cysteine. These roles are typically limited to the intracellular milieu, where the environment is reducing, and cysteine is not oxidized to cystine.

Applications
Cysteine, mainly the -enantiomer, is a precursor in the food, pharmaceutical, and personal-care industries. One of the largest applications is the production of flavors. For example, the reaction of cysteine with sugars in a Maillard reaction yields meat flavors. -Cysteine is also used as a processing aid for baking.

In the field of personal care, cysteine is used for permanent-wave applications, predominantly in Asia. Again, the cysteine is used for breaking up the disulfide bonds in the hair's keratin.

Cysteine is a very popular target for site-directed labeling experiments to investigate biomolecular structure and dynamics. Maleimides selectively attach to cysteine using a covalent Michael addition. Site-directed spin labeling for EPR or paramagnetic relaxation-enhanced NMR also uses cysteine extensively.

Reducing toxic effects of alcohol
Cysteine has been proposed as a preventive or antidote for some of the negative effects of alcohol, including liver damage and hangover. It counteracts the poisonous effects of acetaldehyde. Cysteine supports the next step in metabolism, which turns acetaldehyde into acetic acid.

In a rat study, test animals received an LD90 dose of acetaldehyde. Those that received cysteine had an 80% survival rate; when both cysteine and thiamine were administered, all animals survived. The control group had a 10% survival rate.

In 2020 an article was published that suggests L-cysteine might also work in humans.

N-Acetylcysteine
N-Acetyl--cysteine is a derivative of cysteine wherein an acetyl group is attached to the nitrogen atom. This compound is sold as a dietary supplement, and used as an antidote in cases of acetaminophen overdose.

Sheep
Cysteine is required by sheep to produce wool. It is an essential amino acid that must be taken in from their feed. As a consequence, during drought conditions, sheep produce less wool; however, transgenic sheep that can make their own cysteine have been developed.

Dietary restrictions
The animal-originating sources of -cysteine as a food additive are a point of contention for people following dietary restrictions such as kosher, halal, vegan, or vegetarian. To avoid this problem, -cysteine can also be sourced from microbial or other synthetic processes.

History
In 1884 German chemist Eugen Baumann found that when cystine was treated with a reducing agent, cystine revealed itself to be a dimer of a monomer which he named "cysteïne".

See also

 Amino acids
 Cysteine metabolism
 Cystinuria
 Saville reaction
 Sullivan reaction

References

Further reading

External links
 Cysteine MS Spectrum
 International Kidney Stone Institute 
 http://www.chemie.fu-berlin.de/chemistry/bio/aminoacid/cystein en.html 
 952-10-3056-9 Interaction of alcohol and smoking in the pathogenesis of upper digestive tract cancers - possible chemoprevention with cysteine
 Cystine Kidney Stones
 Kosher View of L-Cysteine

Proteinogenic amino acids
Glucogenic amino acids
Sulfur amino acids
Thiols
Food additives
E-number additives
Excitatory amino acids